Palimpsest: Documents From a Korean Adoption (Swedish: Palimpsest) is a graphic novel written by , a South Korea-born Swedish cartoonist. It was originally published in Swedish in 2016 by Ordfront.

Plot 
It details her quest to discover her origins as, with the assistance of a Korean-speaking friend and her spouse, she navigates the bureaucracy and false statements in South Korean adoption papers supplied by agencies trying to mislead her.

Reception
Karla Strand of Ms. Magazine stated that the book "challenges existing notions of adoption and identity while stressing the importance of owning your own narrative." Chris Gavaler of Popmatters wrote that the document-heavy approach of the work was atypical.

Publishers Weekly wrote that it was "An unflinching indictment of foreign adoption, Sjöblom’s story is also, ironically, an homage to the chosen family who help her find her first family." It describes portions as "text-heavy".

In 2019 Rachel Cooke of The Guardian described it as one of several "best graphic novels of 2019".

Translations 
Its English translation, published in 2019 by Drawn & Quarterly, was by Hanna Strömberg, Lisa Wool-Rim Sjöblom, and Richey Wyver.

It was published in Spanish, with Carmen Montes as the translator, by Barbara Fiore Editora as Palimpsesto in 2019.

See also
 International adoption of South Korean children

References

External links
 Palimpsest - Drawn & Quarterly
 Palimpsest - Ordfront 
 Articles about the author at Aftonbladet 
 Lisa Wool-Rim Sjöblom's blog 

2016 graphic novels
Swedish comics
Adoption in Sweden
Adoption in South Korea
Books about Korea
Works about adoption
International adoption